NGC 701 is a spiral galaxy with a high star formation rate in the constellation Cetus. It is estimated to be 86 million light years from the Milky Way and has a diameter of approximately 65,000 light years. The object was discovered on January 10, 1785 by the German-British astronomer William Herschel.

References

External links 
 

701
Spiral galaxies
Cetus (constellation)
006826